The name Journal of Medical Sciences (sometimes abbreviated J. Med. Sci.) may refer to:

 Journal of Medical Sciences Research, abbreviated J. Med. Sci. Res.
 International Journal of Medical Sciences, abbreviated Int. J. Med. Sci.
 Israel Journal of Medical Sciences, abbreviated Isr. J. Med. Sci.,  replaced by Israel Medical Association Journal
 Alabama Journal of Medical Sciences
 Journal of Medical Sciences , abbreviated J. Med. Sci., active from 1983 to 1985 in Bangladesh
 Journal of Medical Sciences , abbreviated J. Med. Sci. (Faisalabad, Pakistan), Pakistan
 Journal of Medical Sciences (Tapei Taiwan) , published by Medknow Publications
 Journal of Research in Medical Sciences, abbreviated J. Res. Med. Sci., official journal of Isfahan University of Medical Sciences